Arnold Anthony (28 July 1886 – 14 October 1968) was a New Zealand cricketer. He played 52 first-class matches for Auckland and Canterbury between 1905 and 1931.

Anthony was a middle-order batsman, strong on the pull and the square cut, an accurate slow bowler, and a brilliant fieldsman. He was the first winner of the Redpath Cup, awarded since 1920–21 to the best New Zealand batsman of the first-class season. He scored 251 runs in the Plunket Shield in 1920–21 at an average of 62.75, including 55 not out and 113 in Auckland's 382-run victory over Canterbury. He made his highest first-class score of 116 against Canterbury in 1929–30, when he was 43. He took his best bowling figures of 6 for 43 against the touring MCC in 1922–23. He played senior club cricket for Parnell in Auckland until November 1937, when he was 51.

He and his wife Clara married in December 1915. He later served overseas with the New Zealand Expeditionary Force in World War I.

See also
 List of Auckland representative cricketers

References

External links
 

1886 births
1968 deaths
New Zealand cricketers
Auckland cricketers
Canterbury cricketers
Cricketers from Christchurch
New Zealand military personnel of World War I